Thomas Truman (29 December 1880 – 14 September 1918) was an English cricketer. He played for Gloucestershire between 1910 and 1913.

References

1880 births
1918 deaths
English cricketers
Gloucestershire cricketers
People from Newton Abbot
British military personnel killed in World War I